La Papessa is the second album by Colombian-Canadian electronic musician Lido Pimienta, released in 2016. It was named the winner of the 2017 Polaris Music Prize.

Guest musicians on the album include Andrea Echeverri and Melody McKiver.

Track listing
 "Agua" – 4:20
 "La Capacidad" – 4:18
 "Quiero Que Te Vaya Bien (QQTVB)" – 3:27
 "Ruleta" – 4:13
 "Al Unisono Viajan" – 4:23
 "Para Quererte" – 4:10
 "Fornicarte Es Un Arte" (featuring Melody McKiver) – 4:44
 "En Un Minuto" (featuring Andrea Echeverri) – 3:44
 "Quiero Jardines" – 4:13

References

2016 albums
Anti- (record label) albums
Polaris Music Prize-winning albums
Lido Pimienta albums
Spanish-language albums